Clarice Assad (born February 9, 1978) is a Brazilian-American composer, pianist, arranger, singer, and educator from Rio de Janeiro. She is influenced by popular Brazilian culture, Romanticism, world music, and jazz. She comes from a musical family, which includes her father, guitarist Sergio Assad, her uncle, guitarist Odair Assad, and her aunt, singer-songwriter Badi Assad.

Assad has performed professionally since the age of seven. She holds a bachelor of music degree from Roosevelt University in Chicago and a master's degree in composition from the University of Michigan, where she studied composition with Michael Daugherty. She is a 2009 Latin Grammy  and 2022 Grammy nominee.

Early years
Born in Campo Grande, a suburb in the west portion of Rio de Janeiro, Brazil, Assad is the first daughter of musician Sergio Assad and school teacher Celia Maria Vasconcelos da Cunha, who named her child after the late Brazilian-Ukrainian writer Clarice Lispector. Assad began creating music at the age of six with the help of her father.

Assad was born with Ehlers-Danlos Syndrome, a group of disorders that affect connective tissues, which severely limited her ability to perform musical instruments at an early age, but the condition did not affect her voice.  As a child, Assad sang numerous jingles for radio and television, as well as albums including tracks for pop star Luiz Caldas and Brazilian soul musician Hyldon.  During early adolescence, as her joints became stronger, she began playing piano mostly by ear and became interested in jazz.  The years that followed were filled with intensive training in music, piano, composition, and arranging with Sheila Zagury, Linda Bustani, and Leandro Braga.

In 1993, Assad and her younger brother Rodrigo moved to France to live with their father, in a home he shared with his second wife and their child Julia. Assad studied piano and improvisation privately with Natalie Fortin, a professor from Le Conservatoire national Supérieur de Paris, and benefited also from her father's mentorship, composing, and arranging numerous pieces. This was a prolific period, though short-lived amidst a turbulent time. Sergio Assad's wife, who had been battling cancer, died a year later at 38. Assad returned to Brazil with her brother.

In Rio de Janeiro, between 1995 and 1997, Assad acted as a pianist, arranger, and keyboardist on several musicals including Tá na Hora by playwright Lucia Coelho, A Estrela Menina by Joaquim de Paula, and Doidas Folias by playwright and composer Tim Rescala.  Though passionate about music, she struggled with the decision to pursue an academic degree, due to the limited prospects in the industry in Brazil.  As she prepared to study for the entry college exams majoring in marine biology, her father Sergio had met astrophysicist Angela Olinto, and moved to Chicago.  A year later, Assad was given the opportunity to study film scoring at the Berklee College of Music, leaving Brazil in 1998.

Career

Orchestral and chamber music
Assad's compositions include pieces for a variety of instrumentations, including smaller works for piano and guitar as well as for large and small chamber ensembles, and 15 orchestral works. Though the ensembles she writes for are largely classical, her voice as a composer has been heavily influenced by Brazilian music, jazz, pop, and world music.  Her overtures Nhanderú  and Terra Brasilis, commissioned and premiered by the Orquestra Sinfônica do Estado de São Paulo  are examples of her Brazilian roots, drawing on Assad's knowledge of the country's folk style and the work of fellow classical composer Heitor Villa-Lobos.  Among other works influenced by Brazilian popular culture is her concerto for guitar and orchestra, O Saci-Pererê  and Brazilian Fanfare, an overture for orchestra commissioned by the Chattanooga Orchestra in 2005.

She first came into the national spotlight in 2004, when conductor Marin Alsop programmed her violin concerto with the Cabrillo Festival of Contemporary Music featuring Nadja Salerno-Sonnenberg as the soloist. The piece was recorded by Salerno-Sonnenberg and Marin Alsop leading the Colorado Symphony Orchestra and released on the NSS Music label when Assad was 26 years old.  Since then, Assad has been steadily commissioned, pursuing ways of incorporating her composing and performing.  Such efforts culminated in the creation of a major work: a concerto for scat singing, piano and orchestra which she wrote for herself to perform.  Scattered  was premiered by the Albany Symphony under the baton of the conductor David Alan Miller, and has since been performed by many other ensembles and conductors, including the Michigan Philharmonic, Chicago Composers Orchestra and OCAM.  Other works include The Disappeared, a political piece for orchestra and concert band that draws on impressions of Rufina Amaya, the sole survivor of the El Mozote massacre in 1981, during the Salvadoran Civil War, and most recently, Ad Infinitum, a percussion concerto written for Dame Evelyn Glennie involving improvisational gestural techniques—such as sound painting—for the orchestra, soloist and conductor alike.

Her music has been commissioned by many institutions, performers and orchestras including Carnegie Hall, The Boston Philharmonic Youth Orchestra, the Orquestra Sinfônica do Estado de São Paulo, General Electric, the Chicago Sinfonietta, and Duo Noire, to name a few. Her works have also been recorded by some of the most prominent names in the classical contemporary music scene today, including cellist Yo-Yo Ma, violinist Nadja Salerno-Sonnenberg, pianist Anne-Marie McDermott and oboist Liang Wang.  She has also collaborated with the Los Angeles Guitar Quartet, Turtle Island String Quartet, the Aquarelle Guitar Quartet, the Philadelphia Orchestra, Louisville Symphony Orchestra, Austin Symphony Orchestra, Vancouver Symphony Orchestra, Edmonton Symphony, as well as conductors Marin Alsop and Christoph Eschenbach, Kazuyoshi Akiyama and Carlos Miguel Prieto.  She has written extensively for active members on the new music scene in the United States such as the Cavatina Duo, Sybarite5, and SOLI ensemble 

Assad has served as composer-in-residence for the Albany Symphony, the Cabrillo Festival of Contemporary Music and the Boston Landmarks Orchestra.

Assad's works have been published in France (Editions Lemoine), Germany (Trekel), in the United States (Virtual Artists Collective Publishing), and Brazil (Criadores do Brasil).

Other projects

Assad has contributed significantly to the growing repertoire of classical guitar, having written works ranging from solos to duos (Valsas do Rio) and quartets such as the piece Bluezilian, which has become a staple of the guitar quartet repertoire.  Larger works include three concertos: Album de Retratos, commissioned by the ProMusic Chamber Orchestra for two guitars and orchestra, O Saci-Pererê, for solo guitar and chamber orchestra, commissioned by the Harris Foundation, and Folk Tales, a concerto for two guitars and string orchestra commissioned by the Tychy Guitar Festival for the Brazil Guitar duo.

Her latest release of the album Archetypes, performed with her father Sérgio Assad and Chicago-based ensemble Third Coast Percussion, received 2022 Grammy nominations in the Best Chamber Music/Small Ensemble Performance and Best Contemporary Classical Composition categories. The collaboratively written program conjures a dozen universal archetypes through a mélange of chamber music and Latin jazz rhythms.

In 2010, Assad wrote the first of its kind, a concerto for scat singing, piano and orchestra, named Scattered. Many other works followed on this verge, and in 2019, Assad wrote Synthetico, a work for chamber ensemble and vocal electronics . In her continuing explorations with expanding the sonic palette of the voice, both acoustically and through electronic means, Assad also engages audiences directly to immerse themselves in the music. Her 2019 work, É Gol!, which was inspired by the legendary female Brazilian soccer player Marta Vieira da Silva, is scored for full orchestra and features active participation by audience members singing, performing body percussion movements, and making sound effects.

Assad's first work for the stage was a soundtrack written for a 2001 adaptation of Argentinian playwright Carlos Mathus’s play La Lección de Anatomía, originally published in the 1970s.  Directed by an original cast member, Antonio Leiva, the space received mixed reviews but garnered the composer favorable mentions from the acclaimed theater critic Bárbara Heliodora.  Following a hiatus of over a decade, Assad resumed writing for the stage in 2010, when choreographer Kristi Spessard invited her—then in residency at Mabou Mines—to compose the score to her piece Essentials of Flor.

Recent works include the ballets Iara (2018), and Sin Fronteras (2017), Opera das Pedras (libretto by Denise Milan, 2010) 
 and collaborations with librettist Niloufar Talebi (The Disinherited) and playwright E.M. Lewis (The Crossing). Strongly shaped by a conscious drive towards narrative, her works wear its influences well, feeling inspired rather than derivative.

Assad has worked with numerous youth groups through residency programs, often culminating in performances involving large ensembles and orchestras. Most notable are Assad's partnerships with ZUMIX in East Boston and the Boston Landmarks Orchestra; partnerships between the Michigan Philharmonic with WRCJ-FM Detroit public radio and the Detroit School of Arts; as well as the collaboration with Girls INC. and the Albany Symphony that resulted in a pop piece based on Sojourner Truth’s speech “Ain’t I a Woman.”  Assad's projects tend on focus on social impact programs that involve empowering young women.

On November 20, 2022, trumpetist Mary Elizabeth will debut Assad's new concerto for Trumpet and Orchestra, Bohemian Queen, with the Chicago Youth Symphony Orchestra.

Arranger
Assad was the featured composer for the 2008–2009 season at the New Century Chamber Orchestra, where she worked as the orchestra's primary arranger and orchestrator for a decade.

Upon graduating from the University of Michigan, Assad moved to New York City to experience the exploding music scene, freelancing as a composer and arranger while trying to build a career as pianist and singer.  During her New York years (2005–2015), Assad worked as the featured composer for the New Century Chamber Orchestra, as well as serving as the orchestra's primary arranger  from 2007 to 2017, contributing vastly to the addition of new works for strings, by orchestrating and transcribing over twenty five major works from the symphonic repertoire, including Mussorgsky's Pictures at an Exhibition,  Richard Strauss's Dance of the Seven Veils from the opera Salome, and George Gershwin's An American in Paris.

Assad's keen sense of orchestration carefully curates some of the most effective tricks of past greats: Maurice Ravel's elegance and subtleties and Nicolai Rimsky-Korsakov's coloristic orchestral effects—all while retaining a personal, unique fingerprint that's compelling and dramatic in its very construction.

Performer

Hailed by the LA Times as a "dazzling soloist," Assad is an accomplished singer and pianist and appears frequently with orchestras and chamber music ensembles,  performing her original works or arrangements of classical, Brazilian, jazz, and contemporary music.

In 2010, Assad began performing more frequently, and eventually founded the international ensemble Off the Cliff, an energetic and daring four-piece ensemble of internationally accomplished musicians.

Notable performances include the Savannah Music Festival, Moab and the Mendocino Music Festival. Included amongst the venues and series where Off the Cliff has appeared on are Jazz at Lincoln Center in New York City and Doha, Qatar, The Stone,  Cal Performances in San Francisco, and Sesc São Paulo in Brazil. Special guest artists have included Japanese singer Hiromi Suda, Swiss-American singer Beat Kaestli, clarinetist Derek Bermel, mandolinist Mike Marshall, Paquito D'Rivera and the group Choro Famoso.

Educator 
Assad takes the immersive experience outside of the concert hall with the accessible VOXploration, which she created in 2015. The award-winning education program offers a creative and accessible approach to music education through interactive experiences. In an era where digital interaction is part of the daily routine, the class encourages participants to utilize their bodies and voices as musical instruments in spontaneous music creation, songwriting, and improvisation. It has been curated for participants of any age or musical background and has been presented around the world.

Awards in composition

Assad is the recipient of the American Composers Forum National Composition Competition (2016), the McKnight Visiting Composer Award (2015), the New Music Alive Partnership program (League of American Orchestras, 2014–2015), the Van Lier Fellowship (2010), Latin Grammy nomination for best contemporary composition (2009), the Aaron Copland Award (2007), the Morton Gould Young Composer Award (2006), All Songs Considered - NPR (2004), the Franklin Honor Society Award (2001), and the Samuel Ostrowsky Humanities Award (2001).

Discography
 Invitation: Introducing Clarice Assad (2004)
 Love, All That It Is (NSS Music, 2008)
 Home (Adventure Music, 2011)
 Imaginarium (Adventure Music, 2014)
 Clarice Assad & Friends: Live at the Deer Head Inn (Deer Head Inn, 2016)
 Reliquia (Adventure Music, 2016)
 Archetypes Third Coast Percussion, Clarice Assad, Sérgio Assad (Cedille Records, 2021)
 Window To The World: A Tribute to Milton Nascimento: Clarice Assad, Johan Dynnesen, Francesco Calì and Jesper Bodilsen (Vectordisc Records, 2022)

Recorded works

Arrangements & Guest Appearances

Personal life
Assad lives in Chicago, Illinois, with her partner Andrea Santiago and daughter Antonia Assad-Santiago

Interviews
Indicados ao Grammy 2022, Clarice e Sérgio Assad aliam a paixão pela arte e o carinho de família em composições reconhecidas mundo afora- Revista 29 HORAS 
A família de virtuoses do piano e violão que pôs o Brasil no Grammy - Revista VEJA 
Clarice Assad radio interview on UEL, Londrina. Modos de Vida - Comportamento e Cultura
Dreamscapes Q&A with Clarice Assad – SoundAdvice.
Chicago Sinfonietta Commissions CLARICE ASSAD's SIN FRONTERAS Preview – Insights to Assad and her Work.
SONiC Composer Spotlight – Clarice Assad  – SoundAdvice.
University of Chicago Presents: An interview with Clarice Assad 
ABODE MAGAZINE: From Brazil to Carnegie Hall to Doha (p. 106-107)
REVISTA 29 HORAS: DNA Musical 
The Portfolio Composer: Ep 8-Clarice Assad on the Endless Possibilities of New Music and Letting Go 
1TrackPodcast: Season 2, Episode 3.
Composer Clarice Assad was born and raised in Brazil, but has spent the last few decades in the United States. When she's asked where home is, she says "The Americas."
Brazilian and classical music merge in performance from Clarice Assad and two Houston ensembles.

References

External links
 Official website
 Profile: AllMusic.com
  Composer Biography La Jolla Music Society 
 Aaron Copland Award Winners

American jazz composers
Women jazz composers
1978 births
University of Michigan School of Music, Theatre & Dance alumni
Roosevelt University alumni
Living people
American women composers
Musicians from Rio de Janeiro (city)
20th-century jazz composers
21st-century American composers
21st-century jazz composers
Brazilian emigrants to the United States
20th-century Brazilian women singers
20th-century Brazilian singers
20th-century American composers
Bossa nova singers
Hispanic and Latino American musicians
Berklee College of Music alumni
Brazilian jazz singers
Latin jazz pianists
Brazilian jazz pianists
Women jazz pianists
Latin music composers
21st-century American women musicians
21st-century American women singers
21st-century American singers
21st-century pianists
People with Ehlers–Danlos syndrome
20th-century women composers
21st-century women composers
Cedille Records artists
20th-century women pianists
21st-century women pianists